Olhörn Lighthouse (also Leuchtfeuer Olhörn and sometimes Leuchtturm Olderhörn) is a small lighthouse on the German North Sea island of Föhr in Schleswig-Holstein.

The lighthouse is located on the southeastern corner of the island of Föhr, inside the town of Wyk auf Föhr in the Nordfriesland district. It is located on a shallow geestland ridge overlooking the southern beach of Wyk.

It was erected in 1952 to replace a light beacon from 1892. It has a near square shape and was built of massive masonry that was encased by reddish brown bricks. On the gallery there is the lantern room made of metal; it is painted white. The automated lighthouse serves as a cross light for navigation in the Norderaue tidal channel between the mainland port of Dagebüll and the islands of Föhr and Amrum. As such it is a sea mark and also a minor daymark.

Further reading

See also 

 List of lighthouses and lightvessels in Germany

References

External links 

Lighthouses completed in 1952
Lighthouses in Schleswig-Holstein
Föhr
Buildings and structures in Nordfriesland